Maya Tabakova (or Maja Tabakova; ; born May 11, 1978 in Sofia) is a Bulgarian rhythmic gymnast.

At the 1996 Olympic Games, held in Atlanta, she won a silver medal as part of the Bulgarian rhythmic gymnastics group (along with teammates Ina Delcheva, Valentina Kevlian, Maria Koleva, Ivelina Taleva and Viara Vatashka). After the 1996 Atlanta Summer Games,  she was a dancer with the Ringling Bros. and Barnum & Bailey Circus from 1998 to 2005.

See also 
 Gymnastics at the 1996 Summer Olympics – Women's rhythmic group all-around

References

External links 
 Maya Tabakova at FIG
 
 

1978 births
Living people
Bulgarian rhythmic gymnasts
Gymnasts at the 1996 Summer Olympics
Olympic gymnasts of Bulgaria
Gymnasts from Sofia